Complete Savages is an American sitcom that was broadcast on ABC from September 24, 2004 to June 17, 2005. It was part of ABC's final TGIF comedy line-up. The show was created by Mike Scully and Julie Thacker and executive produced by Mel Gibson. It was cancelled after its first season due to low ratings.

Synopsis
The series focuses on single dad Nick Savage struggling to raise his five unruly sons (Jack, Chris, Sam, Kyle, and T.J.) alone, following the abandonment of their mother 10 years previously, while working on call day and night as a firefighter with his brother, Jimmy. The boys constantly stir up trouble and create unpredictable circumstances for the entire family to somehow resolve.

The theme song was composed and performed by Joseph Interlande, and appears at the beginning of each episode as a jam session amongst the whole Savage family.

Cast and characters

Main cast 
 Keith Carradine as Nick Savage – the irritable patriarch of the Savage family. His wife left him ten years prior to the pilot. He gets mad very easily. Although some of the stuff he does to the boys is regarded as unfair, he always shows that he has his sons' best interests at heart and is very concerned for their education and well being, despite his short temper and tendency to lash out at his boys. However, his solution to most problems is to get angry, a solution which seems to have been picked up by his sons Chris and Kyle and occasionally Jack. He works as a firefighter along with his younger brother Jimmy. Although up-tight and ill-tempered he is shown to be a "cool" dad allowing some things slide with his sons for their happiness usually with girls.
 Shaun Sipos as Jack Savage – the eldest son. He is considered the "cool" brother and has many girlfriends. He sings and plays the guitar. Jack often takes on the role of leader for the boys and always organises stages and tries to hold them together, mainly against their father. Jack is often envied tremendously by Sam mainly due to the reason that Jack is popular in school and has many girlfriends while Sam is nerdy and finds it hard to get girls. Although Jack tries to seem independent, he often shows a lot of caring for his brothers, especially T.J.
 Erik von Detten as Chris Savage – considered a dumb jock, as he fails five different school subjects. Chris seems to have a very strong conscience as opposed to Kyle. Chris often agrees with Jack due to Jack's great persuasion skills, combined with the fact that Chris is easily swayed. He also shows violence as a way of solving his problems as he's not good with words. He clearly shows his superiority over his younger brothers through his often used punishment "You're going in the pit" inherited from his father.
 Andrew Eiden as Sam Savage – the middle son considered "black sheep" of the group, as he is responsible and does his school work. He enjoys studying and being with his girlfriend. Sam was always considered by the boys' father as the easiest one to break when the boys were staging a front. 
 Evan Ellingson as Kyle Savage – he is unruly and constantly causing chaos. He has little regard for the safety of himself or others. Unlike his brother Chris, Kyle shows a lack of a conscience. He rarely feels bad or guilty about anything he does. He frequently hangs around with his younger brother T.J., whom he often convinces to do stupid things. Despite his misbehavior, he appears to be more mischievous rather than malicious. He is reckless and proud.
 Jason Dolley as T.J. Savage – the youngest son who basically does everything Kyle tells him to do. He constantly shows his obsession of farts. T.J. is a typical little brother.  He is considered cute but deceiving with a reckless side.
 Vincent Ventresca as Jimmy Savage – Nick's brother who works as a firefighter along with Nick. His personality is quite the opposite of his brother's, and more inline of Nick's sons, and he seemed to lead a careless life.

Minor cast 
 Autumn Reeser as Angela Anderson – Sam's girlfriend. She is very much like Sam, in that she was very studious. She did not show interest in him at first even though Sam is quickly smitten with her and works extremely hard to get her attention.
 Kylie Sparks as Brenda – the neighborhood bully. She is in the glee club, and is not very liked by the Savage family, even Nick pranks her house on Halloween. She is big, brutal and impulsive; expressed interest in dating Sam in one episode.
 Mel Gibson as Officer Steve Cox – a cop in a series of cheesy safety videos. 
 Candace Kita as Misty – Officer Cox's girlfriend in the series of safety videos, who usually dies from an accident involving the theme of the video at the end.
 Betty White as Mrs. Agnes Riley – the crotchety old neighbor who despises the boys and often takes their belongings from them when they go into her yard.
 Kelly as the Savages' nameless pet dog – he is not very fond of Sam but is practically part of the family; eating at the table and getting involved in all the mischief. He is well trained and probably more civil than the boys.
 Mrs Savage – The unseen Matriarch of the family who Nick divorced after a string of incidents that ended with glass in his meatloaf. She is said to be insane by several members of the family and Nick threatens the boys several times with calling her back when they misbehave.

Episodes

Awards and nominations

References

External links
 
 

2004 American television series debuts
2005 American television series endings
2000s American teen sitcoms
American Broadcasting Company original programming
English-language television shows
Television series by Universal Television
TGIF (TV programming block)
Television series about brothers
Television series about teenagers
Television shows set in Boston